This is a list of communities in Quebec. Currently, local municipalities belonging to a regional county municipality are not listed, but they can be accessed through the link to their regional county municipality. For a complete list, see List of municipalities in Quebec.

Types of municipalities 
Types of municipalities in Quebec
List of municipalities in Quebec 
List of township municipalities in Quebec
List of united township municipalities in Quebec
List of parish municipalities in Quebec
List of village municipalities in Quebec
List of cities and towns in Quebec
List of Indian reserves in Quebec
List of unorganized territories in Quebec

Lists of communities

Abitibi-Témiscamingue 
Regional County Municipalities
 Abitibi
 Abitibi-Ouest
 La Vallée-de-l'Or
 Témiscamingue

Independent City
 Rouyn-Noranda

Indian Reserves
 Kebaowek, Quebec
 Lac-Simon, Abitibi-Témiscamingue, Quebec
 Pikogan, Quebec
 Timiskaming, Quebec

Bas-Saint-Laurent 
Regional County Municipalities
 Kamouraska
 La Matapédia
 La Mitis
 Les Basques
 La Matanie
 Rimouski-Neigette
 Rivière-du-Loup
 Témiscouata

Indian Reserves
 Cacouna, Quebec
 Whitworth

Capitale-Nationale 
Regional County Municipalities
 Charlevoix
 Charlevoix-Est
 La Côte-de-Beaupré
 La Jacques-Cartier
 L'Île-d'Orléans
 Portneuf

Independent Cities
 L'Ancienne-Lorette, Quebec
 Quebec City
 Saint-Augustin-de-Desmaures

Independent Parish
 Notre-Dame-des-Anges, Quebec

Indian Reserve
 Wendake, Quebec

Centre-du-Québec 
Regional County Municipalities
 Arthabaska
 Bécancour
 Drummond
 L'Érable
 Nicolet-Yamaska

Indian Reserves
 Odanak, Quebec
 Wôlinak, Quebec

Chaudière-Appalaches 
Regional County Municipalities
 Beauce-Sartigan
 Bellechasse
 La Nouvelle-Beauce
 Les Appalaches
 Les Etchemins
 L'Islet
 Lotbinière
 Montmagny
 Robert-Cliche

Independent City
 Lévis, Quebec
 Borough of Desjardins
 Borough of Les Chutes-de-la-Chaudière-Est
 Borough of Les Chutes-de-la-Chaudière-Ouest

Côte-Nord 
Regional county municipalities
 Caniapiscau
 La Haute-Côte-Nord
 Manicouagan
 Minganie
 Sept-Rivières

Independent municipalities
 Blanc-Sablon
 Bonne-Espérance
 Côte-Nord-du-Golfe-du-Saint-Laurent
 Gros-Mécatina
 Saint-Augustin

Indian reserves
 Essipit
 La Romaine
 Maliotenam
 Matimekosh
 Mingan
 Natashquan
 Pessamit
 Uashat

Naskapi reserved territory
  Kawawachikamach

Estrie 
Regional County Municipalities
 Coaticook
 Le Granit
 Le Haut-Saint-François
 Le Val-Saint-François
 Les Sources
 Memphrémagog

Independent City
 Sherbrooke

Gaspésie–Îles-de-la-Madeleine 
Regional County Municipalities
 Avignon
 Bonaventure
 La Côte-de-Gaspé
 La Haute-Gaspésie
 Le Rocher-Percé

Independent Municipalities
 Grosse-Île, Quebec
 Les Îles-de-la-Madeleine, Quebec

Indian Reserves
 Gesgapegiag, Quebec
 Listuguj, Quebec

Lanaudière 
Regional County Municipalities
 D'Autray
 Joliette
 L'Assomption
 Les Moulins
 Matawinie
 Montcalm

Indian Reserve
 Manawan, Quebec

Laurentides 
Regional County Municipalities
 Antoine-Labelle
 Argenteuil
 Deux-Montagnes
 La Rivière-du-Nord
 Les Laurentides
 Les Pays-d'en-Haut
 Mirabel
 Thérèse-De Blainville

Indian Reserves
 Doncaster, Quebec
 Kanesatake, Quebec

Laval 
Independent City
 Laval (Laval is both a City and a Region)

Mauricie 
Regional County Municipalities
 Les Chenaux
 Maskinongé
 Mékinac

Independent Cities
 La Tuque, Quebec
 Shawinigan
 Trois-Rivières

Independent Municipalities
 La Bostonnais, Quebec
 Lac-Édouard, Quebec

Indian Reserves
 Coucoucache, Quebec
 Obedjiwan, Quebec
 Wemotaci, Quebec

Montérégie 
Regional County Municipalities
 Acton
 Beauharnois-Salaberry
 Brome-Missisquoi
 La Haute-Yamaska
 La Vallée-du-Richelieu
 Le Haut-Richelieu
 Le Haut-Saint-Laurent
 Les Jardins-de-Napierville
 Les Maskoutains
 Marguerite-D'Youville
 Pierre-De Saurel
 Roussillon
 Rouville
 Vaudreuil-Soulanges

Independent Cities
 Boucherville
 Brossard
 Elgin, Quebec
 Longueuil
 Borough of Greenfield Park
 Borough of Le Vieux-Longueuil
 Borough of Saint-Hubert
 Saint-Bruno-de-Montarville
 Saint-Lambert, Quebec

Indian Reserves
 Akwesasne
 Kahnawake, Quebec

Montréal 
Independent Cities
Baie-d'Urfé
Beaconsfield
Côte Saint-Luc
Dollard-des-Ormeaux
Dorval
Hampstead
Kirkland
L'Île-Dorval
Montreal
 Borough of Ahuntsic-Cartierville
 Borough of Anjou
 Borough of Côte-des-Neiges–Notre-Dame-de-Grâce
 Borough of L'Île-Bizard–Sainte-Geneviève
 Borough of LaSalle
 Borough of Lachine
 Borough of Le Plateau-Mont-Royal
 Borough of Le Sud-Ouest
 Borough of Mercier–Hochelaga-Maisonneuve
 Borough of Montréal-Nord
 Borough of Outremont
 Borough of Pierrefonds-Roxboro
 Borough of Rivière-des-Prairies–Pointe-aux-Trembles
 Borough of Rosemont–La Petite-Patrie
 Borough of Saint-Laurent
 Borough of Saint-Léonard
 Borough of Verdun
 Borough of Ville-Marie
 Borough of Villeray–Saint-Michel–Parc-Extension
Montréal-Est
Montreal West
Mount Royal
Pointe-Claire
Sainte-Anne-de-Bellevue
Westmount

Independent Village
Senneville

Nord-du-Québec 
Regional Government
 Kativik

Independent Cities
 Chapais, Quebec
 Chibougamau
 Lebel-sur-Quévillon
 Matagami

Independent Municipality
 Baie-James

Indian Reserve
 Lac-John, Quebec

Cree Villages
 Chisasibi, Quebec
 Eastmain, Quebec
 Mistissini, Quebec
 Nemaska, Quebec
 Waskaganish, Quebec
 Waswanipi, Quebec
 Wemindji, Quebec
 Whapmagoostui, Quebec

Cree Reserved Territories
 Chisasibi Reserved Territory, Quebec
 Eastmain Reserved Territory, Quebec
 Mistissini Reserved Territory, Quebec
 Nemaska Reserved Territory, Quebec
 Waskaganish Reserved Territory, Quebec
 Waswanipi Reserved Territory, Quebec
 Wemindji Reserved Territory, Quebec
 Whapmagoostui Reserved Territory, Quebec

Outaouais 
Regional County Municipalities
 La Vallée-de-la-Gatineau
 Les Collines-de-l'Outaouais
 Papineau
 Pontiac

Independent City
 Gatineau

Indian Reserves
 Kitigan Zibi, Quebec
 Lac-Rapide, Quebec

Saguenay–Lac-Saint-Jean 
Regional County Municipalities
Fjord-du-Saguenay
Lac-Saint-Jean-Est
Domaine-du-Roy
Maria-Chapdelaine

Independent City
Saguenay, Quebec

Indian Reserve
Mashteuiatsh, Quebec

See also

List of cities in Canada
List of towns in Quebec

External links
Commission de Toponymie du Québec

Quebec